Maidenform Peak ( is located in the Teton Range, Grand Teton National Park in the U.S. state of Wyoming. Maidenform Peak is at the head of Leigh Canyon and  SSW of Cleaver Peak. Cirque Lake is immediately east of the peak.

References

Mountains of Grand Teton National Park
Mountains of Wyoming
Mountains of Teton County, Wyoming